St. Thomas Memorial Cemetery located in Overton, Nevada was listed on the United States' National Register of Historic Places on February 1, 2005.

History 
The cemetery was associated with the early Mormon settlements in the area, including St. Thomas, Nevada.  It was moved to its present location in 1935 to remove it from area to be covered by Lake Mead following the construction of Hoover Dam. For a short period it was referred to as Mead Lake Cemetery before finally acquiring the name of St. Thomas Memorial Cemetery. The cemetery is maintained by the community.

References

External links and sources 
 Nevada Department of Cultural Affairs

Cemeteries on the National Register of Historic Places in Nevada
National Register of Historic Places in Clark County, Nevada
Nevada State Register of Historic Places
Buildings and structures in Overton, Nevada